Ramulus thaii is a species of stick insect in the tribe Clitumnini. It has been recorded from Thailand and China.

References

External links
http://www.phasmid.freeservers.com/Photos/Baculum_thaii/

Phasmatidae
Insects described in 1985
Phasmatodea of Indo-China